Puig de la Talaia is a mountain located in the El Montmell municipal term, in the Baix Penedès comarca, Catalonia, Spain. It has an elevation of 801 metres above sea level and is part of the Catalan Pre-Coastal Range.

Talaia, the name of the mountain, means "watchtower" in the Catalan language.

See also
Mountains of Catalonia

References

Mountains of Catalonia